Heristone Wanyonyi Wafula (born 30 June 2003) is a Kenyan racewalker who specializes in the 10,000 m walk. He was the gold medallist at the World Athletics U20 Championships in 2021.

References

External links 

 Heristone Wafula at World Athletics

2003 births
Living people
Kenyan male racewalkers
World Athletics U20 Championships winners
21st-century Kenyan people